"Say You Do" is the debut single by British group Ultra. It was released on 6 April 1998 on CD single in the United Kingdom through East West Records as the first single from their debut album, Ultra (1999). The music video was directed by Katie Bell.

Commercial performance
"Say You Do" debuted and peaked at number 11 in the United Kingdom. It spent 10 weeks in the top 100.

Track listing
CD1 (EW124CD)
 "Say You Do" – 3:39
 "Whatever" – 3:44
 "Evolution" – 3:43

CD2 (EW124CD2)
 "Say You Do" – 3:26
 "Say You Do" (extended version) – 5:40
 "Human After All" – 3:31
 "Say You Do" (CD-ROM video) – 3:40

Vinyl (SAM3187)
 Side A: "Say You Do" – 3:39
 Side B: "Say You Do" (extended version) – 5:40

Charts

Release history

References

1998 debut singles
1998 songs
Ultra (British band) songs
East West Records singles